The 69th Infantry Division (69-ya Pekhotnaya Diviziya) was a reserve infantry formation of the Russian Imperial Army. It was mobilized twice, in 1904–1905 for the Russo-Japanese War and in 1914–1918 for World War I.

Organization
1st Brigade
273rd Infantry Regiment
274th Infantry Regiment
2nd Brigade
275th Infantry Regiment
276th Infantry Regiment

References

Infantry divisions of the Russian Empire